Khloé & Lamar    is an American reality television series that debuted on E! in the United States and Canada on April 10, 2011. The series is the third spin-off of the show Keeping Up with the Kardashians and features reality star Khloé Kardashian and her then-husband, basketball player Lamar Odom. The series returned for its second and final season on February 19, 2012.

Cast
 Khloé Kardashian
 Lamar Odom, Khloé's husband
 Rob Kardashian, Khloé's younger brother
 Malika Haqq, Khloé's best friend

Supporting
 Jamie Sangouthai, Lamar's best friend
 Joseph "Joe" Odom, Lamar's Father
 Kourtney Kardashian, Khloé's oldest sister
 Kim Kardashian, Khloé's older sister
 Kris Jenner, Khloé's mother

Episodes

Series overview

Season 1 (2011)

Season 2 (2012)

References

External links
 
 
 

2010s American reality television series
2011 American television series debuts
2012 American television series endings
English-language television shows
Television series by Bunim/Murray Productions
Television series by Ryan Seacrest Productions
Keeping Up with the Kardashians
Reality television spin-offs
E! original programming
Television shows related to the Kardashian–Jenner family
American television spin-offs